Banaadir is an administrative region (gobol) in southeastern Somalia. It covers the same area as the city of Mogadishu, which serves as the capital. It is bordered to the northwest by the Shabelle river, and to the southeast by the Indian Ocean. Although by far the smallest administrative region in Somalia, it has the largest population, estimated at 1,650,227 (including 369,288 internally displaced persons) in 2014.

The territorial extent and scope of the term Benadir has varied in definition throughout its history, with medieval usage extending Benadir to huge swaths of coast adjacent to Mogadishu stretching as far as hundreds of miles. The early modern period which extended the meaning of Benadir to the interior midway towards the Hirshabelle region, to the contemporary period wherein sometimes the nonstandard misnomer of usage being interchangeable with the city of Mogadishu. This Banaadir municipality is bordered to the north by Hirshabelle and to the southwest by South West, and is the only Somali gobol (administrative region) which is both a municipality and a gobol known as a region.

Overview

The Banaadir region is bordered by the Middle Shebelle (Shabeellaha Dhexe) and Lower Shebelle (Shabeellaha Hoose), as well as the Indian Ocean.

"Benaadir" is derived from the Somali banaadir, which means "coast", in reference to the southern Somali coastal cities Mogadishu, Merka and Barawa. The place name reflects the region's medieval position as a key trade center with Persia, Arabian peninsula and the Swahili coast.

The name derives from the Persian bandar meaning ‘port’ or ‘harbour’.

Its capital is Mogadishu, known locally as Xamar (pronounced: Hamar), although the administrative region itself is coextensive with the city. Benaadir is much smaller than the historical region of Benadir, which covers most of the country's central and southern seaboard opposite the Indian Ocean and up to the Juba River, including Mogadishu.

Thabit M. Abdi was appointed mayor of Mogadishu and governor of Banaadir in 2017, succeeding Yusuf Hussein Jimale who held that post since November 2015.

History

Political
Tradition and old records assert that southern Somalia, including the Mogadishu area, was inhabited by benadiri's centuries  and was during the early modern period considered the wealthiest city on the East African coast, as well as the center of a thriving textile industry. In the 17th century, Mogadishu and parts of southern Somalia fell under the Hiraab Imamate and in the 19th century came under the Geledi Sultanate's sphere of influence.

After the Somali Republic became independent in 1960, Mogadishu became known and promoted as the White Pearl of the Indian Ocean. After the ousting of the Siad Barre regime in 1991 and the ensuing Somali Civil War, various militias fought for control of the city, later to be replaced by the Islamic Courts Union in the mid-2000s. The ICU thereafter splintered into more radical groups, notably the al-Shabaab, which fought the Transitional Federal Government (2004–2012) and its African Union Mission to Somalia allies. With a change in administration in late 2010, government troops and their military partners had succeeded in forcing out Al-Shabaab by August 2011. Mogadishu has then subsequently experienced a period of intense reconstruction.

Population

The 1,650,227 (as of 2014) residents of Benaadir are 50.7% female and come from 303,021 households. It has the highest percentage of residents who are internally displaced persons among the regions of Somalia, because of its relative safety, economic opportunities and availability of resources.

Districts

The Banaadir region consists of seventeen districts. Warta Nabada District was previously known as Wardhigley District until it was officially renamed in 2012. Kahda District was formed in 2013 and is still absent from most maps.

Abdiaziz District
Bondhere District
Daynile District
Dharkenley District
Hamar-Jajab District
Hamar-Weyne District
Hodan District
Howl-Wadag District
Huriwa District
Kaxda District
Karan District
Shangani District
Shibis District
Waberi District
Wadajir District
Warta Nabada District
Yaqshid District

References

External links
Administrative map of Banaadir

 
Regions of Somalia
Mogadishu
Geography of Somalia